The Davao Death Squad (DDS) is a vigilante group in Davao City, Philippines. The group is alleged to have conducted summary executions of street children and individuals suspected of petty crimes and drug dealing. It has been estimated that the group is responsible for the killing or disappearance of between 1,020 and 1,040 people between 1998 and 2008. As early as 2005, the US State Department had received reports of  investigation regarding the alleged connection of the Duterte political dynasty of Davao to the killings. Investigations by Human Rights Watch and the Philippine Commission of Human Rights (CHR) followed. The 2009 report by the CHR noted stonewalling by local police under Duterte while a leaked cable observed a lack of public outrage among Davao residents.

Victims
According to Amnesty International and local human rights groups, death squads killed over 300 people in Davao City between 1998 and 2005. The rate of killing accelerated after this so that between 2005 and 2008 death squads were responsible for between 700 and 720 executions. According to a 2009 report by Human Rights Watch, the victims were mostly alleged drug dealers, petty criminals, and street children. Amnesty International states that killings and extrajudicial executions, particularly of criminal suspects, continued throughout the year. In Mindanao many such killings, including those of minors, were attributed to the so-called "Davao Death Squad" vigilante group. It was reported that local officials in some areas advocated a "shoot to kill" policy with respect to criminal suspects resisting arrest.

Retired Policeman Arthur Lascañas, a self-confessed leader of DDS, claims that the group was responsible for mosque bombings and the killing of a journalist during its heyday. According to Lascañas, the squad was ordered to bomb mosques in Davao in retaliation for the San Pedro Cathedral bombing.

Origins
DDS was conceptualized by former Integrated National Police Regional Commander Dionisio Tan-Gatue Jr. to fight the New People's Army's Sparrow Unit. Tan-Gatue allegedly used the late Juan "Jun" Pala, a known anti-New People's Army propagandist and radio commentator, to report stories about the death squad, which allegedly curbed executions perpetrated by the Sparrow Unit. By mid-1997, the DDS were deemed responsible for more than 60 unsolved murders in the city. It is believed that the original members of the death squad included former members of the Sparrow Unit. Initially the death squad had around 10 members but this had increased to around 500 by 2009.

Vigilante methods
Members of the death squad were managed by either currently serving or ex-police officers, according to Human Rights Watch. These officers provided the assailants with training, weapons and ammunition, motorcycles, and information on the targets. Lists of targets were drawn up by police or barangay (village or district) officials. Information might include a name, address and a photograph. Local police stations were allegedly pre-warned to facilitate the murders and escape of the assailants. Witnesses reported that police officers took a surprisingly long time to respond to incidents even where these occurred in the vicinity of police stations and officers neglected to follow basic investigative procedures, such as collecting bullet casings from the street. Human Rights Watch reported that the standard tactics of the killers was to arrive in small groups of two or three on unlicensed motorbikes. Victims would be stabbed or shot without warning during daytime in public areas such as bars, cafes, markets, shopping areas, jeepneys or tricycles and in the presence of numerous witnesses. Assailants were generally paid between PHP5,000 and PHP50,000 (US$114 – US$1,147) for an assassination, depending on the target.

Public opinion
There appears to have been a certain degree of public approval among citizens of Davao City for the actions of the death squad, primarily fueled by public discontent at "the arduous and ineffective judicial system" that created an environment where extrajudicial executions seemed to be a "practical resort" to suppress crime in the city. There were subsequent reports of death squads operating in other cities, including General Santos, Digos, and Tagum City in Mindanao as well as in Cebu City, the second largest city in the Philippines.

Official complicity
In its 2009 report Human Rights Watch criticized authorities for failing to act against the death squads. It condemned the then president, Gloria Macapagal Arroyo for tolerating the lawlessness, saying that she had, "largely turned a blind eye to the killing spree in Davao City and elsewhere." In 2004 Arroyo had announced Duterte as her special adviser on crime, an appointment which was viewed as signifying her approval of extrajudicial killings. Human Rights Watch also highlighted the inaction of the Philippine National Police and national institutions such as the Department of Justice, the Ombudsman's Office, and the Commission on Human Rights. This official tolerance of vigilantism had created, they said, an environment of "widespread impunity". From 2009 Philippines government institutions periodically stated their intention to investigate the death squads. On one such occasion the National Commission on Human Rights created an inter-agency task force to look into the matter. However, no real action was forthcoming. Later, in 2008 the UN special rapporteur on extrajudicial executions, Philip Alston, pointed out that the fact that the killers made no effort to hide their identity and threatened parents with the murder of their children, suggested a belief by the killers that they were immune from police action.

In 2005 the deputy ombudsman for the Military and Other Law Enforcement Offices suspended four senior police officials for six months without pay because of their failure to solve a number of vigilante killings in their area. In an official statement the deputy ombudsman said:
"The inability of the respondent police officers to prevent the summary killing in Davao City is an indication of gross neglect of duty and inefficiency and incompetence in the performance of official functions."

When the four officers were suspended, the mayor of Davao, Duterte, directed the four officials to file a petition for certiorari, on the basis that the penalty would demoralize the police, reportedly claiming, "I have pledged to help [the police] especially when they are prosecuted for simply performing their duties," The suspension order was subsequently reversed by the Court of Appeals after the police officers filed a petition.

In 2012 the Office of the Ombudsman charged 21 police officers with a charge of simple neglect of duty over the vigilante killings. The charge provided for penalties of 1-month suspension or a fine of 1 month's salary. Investigators from the Ombudsman's office found that there was an "unusually high number of unsolved killings" from 2005 to 2008 in the areas of jurisdiction of the officers' precincts. The officers ranged in seniority from police chief inspector to police senior superintendent.

Alleged involvement of Rodrigo Duterte

Former Davao City Mayor and current president of the Philippines Rodrigo Duterte has been heavily criticized by numerous organizations for condoning and even inciting executions to take place during his leadership.

Human Rights Watch reported that in 2001–2002, Duterte appeared on local television and radio and announced the names of "criminals", some of whom were later executed. In July 2005 at a crime summit in the Manila Hotel the politician said, "Summary execution of criminals remains the most effective way to crush kidnapping and illegal drugs".
In 2009, Duterte said: "If you are doing an illegal activity in my city, if you are a criminal or part of a syndicate that preys on the innocent people of the city, for as long as I am the mayor, you are a legitimate target of assassination."

Duterte then responded to a reported arrest and subsequent release of a notorious drug lord in Manila.

Referring to the arrest of a suspected rice smuggler, Duterte also spoke out at a Senate hearing, saying: "If this guy would go to Davao and starts to unload (smuggled rice)… I will gladly kill him." For these comments Duterte was attacked in an editorial in The Manila Times, which condemned "the mentality of lawlessness and vigilantism." The newspaper argued that this culture of impunity enabled those in power, including officials, "private warlords and businessmen vigilantes" to take retribution against those they felt had acted against their interests: "They kill journalists exposing corruption and human rights activists exposing abusive police and military men." Following Duterte's comments in relation to killing a person suspected of smuggling rice, the office of the President of the Philippines then under Benigno Aquino III issued a statement saying, "Killing a person is against the law. The President has been firm in the belief that no one is above the law. We must not resort to extralegal methods."

Commenting on Duterte, the UN special rapporteur on extrajudicial, summary or arbitrary executions said in 2008, "The mayor's positioning is frankly untenable: He dominates the city so thoroughly as to stamp out whole genres of crime, yet he remains powerless in the face of hundreds of murders committed by men without masks in view of witnesses."

However, despite his earlier statements of support for the extrajudicial killing of criminals, Duterte has constantly denied any involvement in the death squad.

In a January 2016 decision by the Office of the Ombudsman on the investigation conducted by the Commission on Human Rights on the alleged death squad in Davao between 2005 and 2009, the Ombudsman found no evidence to support "the killings attributed or attributable to the Davao Death Squad, much less the involvement of Mayor Rodrigo Duterte" to such acts. (Ombudsman Conchita Carpio-Morales said she recused herself from these investigations because of affinity with Duterte. Morales is the sister of attorney Lucas Carpio, Jr., husband of Court of Appeals Justice Agnes Reyes Carpio. Agnes and Lucas are the parents of Sara Duterte's husband, Mans Carpio. Sara Duterte is President Duterte's daughter and now-mayor of Davao City).

When Duterte was elected president, he appointed Vitaliano Aguirre II, a former classmate, as his secretary of the Department of Justice. Aguirre had been the former mayor's lawyer against cases linking the latter to the death squads as well as the lawyer of a policeman who owned a quarry site turned into a firing range where remains of supposed victims of these alleged death squads were believed to have been buried. Aguirre helped argue against the CHR's investigation of the said quarry site, succeeding in having an earlier search warrant quashed.

During the Senate hearing on extrajudicial killings on September 15, 2016, Edgar Matobato, a former member of the "Lambada Boys" (later renamed the DDS) testified that then-Davao City Mayor Duterte ordered the group to bomb a mosque and to kill the Muslim brethren therein in 1993, an event that another report on this so-called bombing placed as having been perpetrated by so-called "Christian militants" eight hours after Matobato's testified-to time of the incident, with no casualties reported. Because of other inconsistencies in Matobato's allegations, Senator Panfilo Lacson invoked the legal principle of falsus in uno, falsus in omnibus (false in one, false in everything).

On December 14, 2016, Senator Leila de Lima reminded the people that the president's admission to committing murder is grounds for impeachment under the country's current constitution. De Lima said this in response to the president publicly commenting that he had killed drug suspects when he was Mayor of Davao. De Lima was arrested in March 2017 due to allegations that she was accepting bribes from prisoners while she was Justice Secretary. Many international organizations and Filipino citizens voiced their concern regarding the arrest of Senator De Lima. Since she is an outspoken critic of Duterte and his war on drugs many believe that is why she was arrested. Duterte's administration claimed that the reason for De Lima's arrest was due to the alleged bribes she received from imprisoned drug lords in order to allow them to continue to operate behind bars, and not her opinion on Duterte.

As of January 2020, the International Criminal Court confirmed that an investigation into Duterte's involvement with the death squads was ongoing, despite the Philippines having withdrawn from the ICC two years prior, because it continued to have jurisdiction over crimes committed when the country was still a member. Duterte had withdrawn the country just one month after the opening of the investigation.

Portrayal on film
A film depicting vigilante killings in the Philippines Engkwentro ("Square Off"), premiered in July 2009 at the Cinemalaya Independent Film Festival, where it received strong reactions. The film was later selected for the 66th Venice International Film Festival where it won the Best Picture award in the Orizzonti (New Horizons) program. At the same festival director Pepe Diokno won the Luigi de Laurentiis Venice Award for a Debut Film, also known as the "Lion of the Future" prize.

Other uses of the term 
The initialism DDS has been adopted by hardline civilian supporters of Duterte in order to stand for 'Diehard Duterte Supporters'. According to political science Professor and Manila Times columnist Antonio Contreras of De La Salle University, the term was adopted by Duterte supporters during the President's campaign in 2016 and used "as a rallying point to consolidate the Duterte political base."

See also
 Death squad
 Extrajudicial killings and forced disappearances in the Philippines

References

External links
 
 

Child abuse
Crime in the Philippines
Davao City
Rodrigo Duterte
Human rights abuses in the Philippines
Vigilantes
Philippine Drug War